Austen Robin Crapp CBE (born 5 March 1934) is a former Australian prelate of the Roman Catholic Church.

Born in Sydney, New South Wales, Crapp was ordained to the priesthood in 1959. He was appointed bishop of Aitape, Papua New Guinea, in 1999, serving until his retirement in 2009.

References

1934 births
Living people
Australian expatriates in Papua New Guinea
Commanders of the Order of the British Empire
Clergy from Sydney
21st-century Roman Catholic bishops in Papua New Guinea
Roman Catholic bishops of Aitape